The Iranian National Road Race Championships is a cycling race where the Iranian cyclists decide who will become the champion for the year to come.

Men

Elite

U23

See also
Iranian National Time Trial Championships
National Road Cycling Championships

National road cycling championships
Cycle races in Iran
Recurring sporting events established in 1999
1999 establishments in Iran